Lama Tone (born 24 January 1971 in Auckland) is a New Zealand-born Samoan rugby union player. He plays as a lock.

Career
His first international cap was during a match against Tonga, at Sydney, on 18 September 1998. He was part of the 1999 Rugby World Cup roster, playing 4 matches. His last international cap was during a match against Fiji, at Tokyo, on 8 July 2001. He also played for Counties Manukau in the NPC.

Personal life
Tone currently works as architect.

References

External links

Lama Tone at New Zealand Rugby History

1971 births
Living people
Rugby union players from Auckland
Samoan rugby union players
Samoan expatriates in New Zealand
Rugby union locks
Samoa international rugby union players